The 2024 United States Senate election in New York will be held on November 5, 2024, to elect a member of the United States Senate to represent the state of New York. Incumbent two-term Democratic Senator Kirsten Gillibrand was re-elected with 67.0% of the vote in 2018.

Democratic primary

Candidates

Declared
Kirsten Gillibrand, incumbent U.S. Senator

Potential
Andrew Cuomo, 56th Governor of New York (2011-2021), 6th Attorney General of New York (2007-2010), and former U.S. Secretary of Housing and Urban Development (1997-2001)
Mondaire Jones, former U.S. Representative from 
Alexandria Ocasio-Cortez, U.S. Representative from

Declined
Al Franken, former U.S. Senator from Minnesota
Ritchie Torres, U.S. Representative from

Republican primary

Candidates

Publicly expressed interest

Potential
Nicole Malliotakis, U.S. Representative from

General election

Predictions

References

External links
Kirsten Gillibrand (D) for Senate

2024
New York
United States Senate